The Stimson Scorcher is a three-wheeled vehicle designed by Barry Stimson and first produced in the UK in 1976. The Scorcher was available preassembled or as a kit, sold by Noovoh Developments of Brighton for £385 (equivalent to £ in ).

During its four-year production run, ending in 1980, 30 Scorchers were produced. There was an unsuccessful attempt to resuscitate the Scorcher project the following year.

Construction
The glassfibre body is mounted on a steel tubular-frame chassis and is completely open to the elements, offering the vehicle's occupants no protection from the weather. Even the engine is exposed, unless the buyer purchased the optional plastic bonnet.

The Scorcher has two wheels at the front and conventional car controls. Its unusual configuration of three seats with the driver and passengers sitting in line astride the machine meant that the UK's licensing authority classified it as a motorcycle and sidecar combination, which had the consequence that one of the passengers was not required to wear a crash helmet.

Engine and transmission

Later developments
Scorcher production ended in 1980, but in 1981 the project was bought by Gerald Pickford of Clanfield. Pickford made some design changes to the lower front end, but by the end of 1982 only three of the new Scorchers had been produced.

Appraisal
In a 2003 interview published in The Daily Telegraph, Stimson observed of the Scorcher that "It's the worst seller of all my cars, but the most famous – I find that weird". Motoring journalist and author Steve Hole has described the Scorcher as "one of the most bonkers kit cars ever made".

References

Notes

Citations

Bibliography

External links
Video of the Stimson Scorcher in action

Three-wheeled motor vehicles
Cars introduced in 1976